Thomas Maria Renz (born December 9, 1957 in München) is a German theologian and, since April 29, 1997, an auxiliary bishop of the Diocese of Rottenburg-Stuttgart and the Titular Bishop of Rucuma.

Renz was ordained for the Diocese of Rottenburg-Stuttgart in Rome in 1984.  Then, he worked as a Reverent in Bad Saulgau. At 39, he was the youngest participant of the German Bishops Conference.  On account of his uncomplicated manner, he is called the "Bishop of Youth."

References

1957 births
Living people
German Roman Catholic titular bishops
Auxiliary bishops